The Leicester Square Theatre is a 400-seat theatre in Leicester Place, immediately north of Leicester Square, in the City of Westminster, London. It was previously known as Notre Dame Hall, Cavern in the Town and The Venue. The theatre hosts stand-up comedy, cabaret, music, plays and comedies.



History
The building originated as the Notre Dame Hall  in 1953, replacing an earlier building that had been destroyed by World War II bombing, and part of the rebuild of the adjacent Notre Dame de France church, and the hall was used as a French cultural centre for a time.  It became a popular music venue in the 1960s under the name Cavern in the Town, regularly hosting beat music group The Small Faces.  It was renamed Notre Dame Hall in the 1970s and presented The Rolling Stones and The Who, but specialised in punk music, hosting such acts as The Sex Pistols.  In 1979, The Clash previewed material from London Calling here shortly before recording the album. In 2001, it was converted to a theatre and named The Venue.

Productions at The Venue included the world premiere of the Boy George musical Taboo, which played a highly successful run in 2002 before transferring to Broadway; and Round the Horne (2003)

In 2008 the theatre was under new ownership and underwent refurbishment of the auditorium and bars and reopened in August with the new name of the Leicester Square Theatre. The opening season included American comedian Joan Rivers making her acting debut with her play Joan Rivers: A Work in Progress by a Life in Progress, which played a total of 75 performances to celebrate her birthday. A musical based on the comic strip Alex, by Charles Peattie and Russell Taylor, starring Robert Bathurst, finished the year 2008.

The theatre has subsequently been host to many comedians such as Al Murray, Michael McIntyre, Arabella Weir, Dave Chappelle, Ed Gamble, Janey Godley, Jerry Sadowitz, Jim Gaffigan, Tim Vine, Mark Thomas, Michelle Wolf, Micky Flanagan, Rachel Parris, Ricky Gervais, Ruby Wax, Sean Lock, Tom Stade and Stewart Lee established their audience by playing the theatre regularly.  Theatre shows have included Tiddler, Scarecrows Wedding, Private Peaceful, An Evening With Joan Collins and Musik (the Pet Shop Boys Musical). Music has been performed by Blake, Mark Kingswood, Macy Gray, Buddy Greco, Joe Longthorne, Hazel O'Connor and Boy George.

Performers who have returned regularly to the venue include Bill Bailey, Frank Skinner, Frankie Boyle, Henning Wehn, Richard Herring, Stacey Kent and Stewart Lee. The theatre has a long-standing relationship with the children's theatre show Stick Man, which has been a regular feature for some years over the festive season.

The theatre launched its New Comedian of the Year competition in 2009.  This competition has seen many well-known acts come through to become finalists, including Rob Beckett, Rachel Parris, Dane Baptiste, Sofie Hagen, Tim Renkow, Joby Mageean, Bilal Zafar and Tez Ilyas.  It is regarded as one of the best New Comedian competitions, and has given rise to the Not So New Comedian Competition and Sketch Off, both at the theatre's sister venue, the Museum of Comedy.

The theatre is owned and managed by artistic director Martin Witts.

References

External links

Studio theatres in London
Theatres in the City of Westminster
Leicester Square